The N64 is a home video game console developed by Nintendo.

N64 may also refer to:
 Maung language
 N64 highway, in the Philippines
 Nebraska Highway 64, in the United States
 "N64", a song by rapper Denzel Curry from his album Nostalgic 64